Ice Queen may refer to:

 Ice Queen (film), a 2005 American horror film
 "Ice Queen" (JAG), an episode of JAG and the first part of the backdoor pilot of NCIS
 "Ice Queen" (song), a song by Within Temptation
 The Ice Queen, a 2005 novel by Alice Hoffman
 The Ice Queen, a 2018 album by Sue Foley
 Cleo Ice Queen (born 1989), Zambian hip hop recording artist
 The gender-swapped version of Ice King in the Adventure Time episode "Fionna and Cake"

See also
 Snow Queen (disambiguation)